Albert Tugbe Chie is a Liberian politician and Member of the Senate of Liberia from Grand Kru County Constituency who is serving as President Pro Tempore of the Senate of Liberia.

References 

Members of the Senate of Liberia
Living people
Year of birth missing (living people)